Telekom Dome is an indoor sporting arena that is located in Bonn, Germany. The seating capacity of the arena for basketball games is 6,000 spectators.

History
Telekom Dome opened in 2008. It has been used as the home arena of the professional German Basketball League team Telekom Baskets Bonn. It replaced the club's former home arena, the Hardtberghalle.

Gallery

External links

 Telekom Dome
Telekom Dome inside imagine 1
Telekom Dome inside imagine 2
Telekom Dome inside imagine 3
Telekom Dome

Indoor arenas in Germany
Basketball venues in Germany
Telekom Baskets Bonn
Buildings and structures in Bonn
Sports venues in North Rhine-Westphalia